Multiple rebellions and closely related events have occurred in the United States, beginning from the colonial era up to present day. Events that are not commonly named strictly a rebellion (or using synonymous terms such as "revolt" or "uprising"), but have been noted by some as equivalent or very similar to a rebellion (such as an insurrection), or at least as having a few important elements of rebellion (such an armed occupation of government property), are also included in this list. Anti-government acts by individuals are not included.

See also
 List of incidents of civil unrest in the United States
 Terrorism in the United States

References